Guantánamo CB is a professional basketball club that is based in Guantánamo, Cuba. The club competes in the Cuban League.

History
Guantánamo CB competed at the 1985 edition of the Intercontinental Cup.

References

External links
LatinBasket.com Team Page

Basketball teams in Cuba